The Waitakere Rangers were a team in the now defunct Bartercard Cup Rugby league competition in New Zealand. They represented five clubs based in Waitakere City including the Glenora Bears who previously represented the City in the Bartercard Cup. The other four clubs were the Waitemata Seagulls, Te Atatu Roosters, New Lynn Stags and Bay Roskill Vikings. They were based at the Trusts Stadium although on occasion they played their matches at the grounds of their feeder clubs.

Notable players 
At various times their playing squad included former Warrior Cliff Beverley, former Melbourne Storm player Matt Rua and Awen Guttenbeil's brother Karl. Warriors assigned to the Rangers included Epalahame Lauaki and Sione Faumuina.

History

2006 results 

In 2006 the Rangers secured a playoff position and eventually finished third. The Rangers lost a close play-off match in Christchurch to the Canterbury Bulls 26-20 and then lost to the Tamaki Leopards 25–24 in extra time the following weekend to be elimiminated from the play-offs.

2007 results 

After finishing fourth in the regular season, The Rangers were defeated by the Canterbury Bulls 35–18 in the first week of the playoffs to be eliminated from the competition.

References

See also 
 Auckland Rugby League
 Bartercard Cup
 New Zealand Rugby League
 New Zealand Warriors
 Rugby league in New Zealand
 Super City Rangers

Auckland rugby league clubs
Defunct rugby league teams in New Zealand
Rugby clubs established in 2006
2006 establishments in New Zealand
2008 disestablishments in New Zealand